Adrián Menéndez and Simone Vagnozzi were the defending champions but decided not to participate.
Nicholas Monroe and Simon Stadler won the final 6–4, 3–6, [11–9] against Andrey Golubev and Yuri Schukin.

Seeds

Draw

Draw

References
 Main Draw

Aspria Tennis Cup - Doubles
2012 Doubles